The Coritiba Crocodiles are a professional Brazilian American football team headquartered in Curitiba, Paraná. Founded as the Barigui Crocodiles by a group of friends who used to watch NFL games, the team name originated from a crocodile that lived in Parque Barigui's lake.

In 2008, they were the first Brazilian American Football team to play internationally, going up against the Emperadores from Uruguay.

In 2009, the Crocodiles played in the Pantanal Bowl, but unfortunately, did not emerge victorious, placing second.

On January 21, 2011, the Barigui Crocodiles merged with the Coritiba Foot Ball Club. It was decided that the two names would be mixed, creating the Coritiba Crocodiles.

Currently, Coritiba are the Brazilian champions, having won the Brazilian American Football championship in 2013, 2014 and 2022.

References 

Coritiba Foot Ball Club